"I'll Wait for You" is a song written by Bill Anderson and Harley Allen and recorded by American country music artist Joe Nichols. It was released in July 2006 as the third single from Nichols' album III.  The song reached number 7 on the U.S. Billboard Hot Country Songs chart and peaked at #71 on the Billboard Hot 100.

Content
The protagonist wants to visit his wife, but is stranded in Montana due to a snowstorm, and so calls her to inform her of his plans. She replies that she will wait for him, while reminiscing over occasions such as the previous Christmas and the day their son was born, where she did not want the big moment to take place (e.g., the opening of presents, inducing of labor) without her husband present. In the final verse, it is revealed that the wife is on her deathbed at the hospital, and her husband has arrived too late to see her. She has left him a note stating that she will wait for him before entering heaven.

Music videos
Two videos were made for the song. In the first video, Nichols plays the song's protagonist at various ages; makeup was used to make him appear thirty years older. The song's first video first aired on the television network CMT on November 23, 2006. A second video was later made, featuring an acoustic remix of the song and shot in black and white. This version is the one most often played on TV. This second video was directed by Chris Hicky, while Warren P. Sonada directed the original video.

Chart positions

Year-end charts

References

2006 singles
Country ballads
2000s ballads
Joe Nichols songs
Songs written by Bill Anderson (singer)
Songs written by Harley Allen
Song recordings produced by Buddy Cannon
Show Dog-Universal Music singles
Music videos directed by Chris Hicky
2005 songs